John Cho (born Cho Yo-Han; June 16, 1972) is an American actor known for his roles as Harold Lee in the Harold & Kumar films, and Hikaru Sulu in the Star Trek rebooted film series.

Early in his career, Cho also starred in the Asian American–centered films Shopping for Fangs (1997), Yellow (1998) and Better Luck Tomorrow (2002). In 2017, he received critical acclaim for his performance in the hit indie film Columbus. In 2018, he starred in the thriller film Searching, making him the first Asian American actor in history to headline a mainstream thriller film in Hollywood. He was nominated for the Independent Spirit Award for Best Male Lead for his performance in Searching.

He also made history in American television in the 21st century as the first Asian-American actor cast as a romantic lead in a romantic comedy series when he starred as Henry Higgs in the 2014 sitcom Selfie. In addition to his role in Selfie, Cho has had lead roles in series such as FlashForward and Off Centre, and recurring roles in Go On, Sleepy Hollow and Difficult People.

Early life 
Born in Seoul, South Korea, Cho moved to the United States in 1978. He was raised in Los Angeles, where his family settled after living in Houston, Seattle, Daly City, California, and Monterey Park, California. His father was a minister in the Church of Christ and was originally from North Korea. He grew up with one younger brother. Cho graduated from Herbert Hoover High School, in Glendale, California, in 1990.

Cho attended the University of California, Berkeley. In 1994, he toured nationally for a stage production of Maxine Hong Kingston's The Woman Warrior by the Berkeley Repertory Theatre. He graduated in 1996 with a Bachelor of Arts in English literature.

Career 
After graduation, Cho taught English literature at Pacific Hills School in West Hollywood, California, while acting at East West Players in downtown Los Angeles. There, he appeared in Edward Sakamoto's The Taste of Kona Coffee in 1996 and in Euijoon Kim's film My Tired Broke Ass Pontificating Slapstick Funk in 2000.

Cho gained attention with a small role as "MILF Guy #2" in the 1999 comedy American Pie, in which he popularized the slang term MILF. Cho reprised the role in three sequels: American Pie 2, American Wedding, and the latest installment American Reunion in which he has a much larger role. His character initially had no name but he was given the name "John" in the third film, named after Cho himself.

Cho guest-starred on Charmed as a ghost in the episode "Dead Man Dating" in 1998 and was one of the stars of the short-lived situation comedy Off Centre from 2001 to 2002. He was a costar on the Fox sitcom Kitchen Confidential based on Anthony Bourdain's best-selling book. He had supporting roles in the science fiction comedy Evolution directed by Ivan Reitman, Down to Earth , and Bowfinger.

In 2002, Cho had a starring role in the ensemble cast of Justin Lin's Better Luck Tomorrow, a drama focusing on the travails of a group of Asian Americans living in Southern California who are academically successful but socially discontented, and as a result engage in wantonly violent, criminal behavior. It was well received by critics, with Elvis Mitchell of The New York Times describing Cho's character's "lazy magnetism of which he is charmingly aware". Later that year, the movie Big Fat Liar was released, in which Cho played a Hong Kong-based film director. He refused to do the accent scripted for his character. The director worked with him to re-develop the role.

Cho had a successful starring role as Harold Lee in 2004's Harold & Kumar Go to White Castle and reprised the role in 2008's Harold & Kumar Escape from Guantanamo Bay which earned $38million at the box office, and again in 2011's A Very Harold & Kumar 3D Christmas which made $35million. Cho's role in the popular franchise was written specifically for him by Hayden Schlossberg, and Cho has recounted that when Schlossberg first approached him with the role, he was initially suspicious.

Cho appeared in the July 2004 issue of KoreAm Journal and, in September 2006, was cast in NBC's new comedy The Singles Table, but the series never aired due to changes in scheduling and production. In 2006 and again in 2009, Cho was selected as one of the sexiest men alive in People magazine.

In 2007, Cho was added to the cast of Ugly Betty as a recurring character. Cho plays Kenny, a best friend of accountant Henry Grubstick. Cho played helmsman Hikaru Sulu in J. J. Abrams's feature film Star Trek. Manohla Dargis of The New York Times praised him for making his role "ultimately and rather wonderfully [his] own".

Cho appeared in Nas's "Be a Nigger Too" music video along with various celebrities, and had a guest appearance on the sitcom How I Met Your Mother, in the episode "I'm Not That Guy" where he played a partner in an evil law firm. Of the latter, Staci Krause of IGN, wrote that Cho was "the scene stealer in this episode" and that she would "definitely like to see more of him" in the series.

From 2009 to 2010, Cho starred in the television series FlashForward as FBI Special Agent Demetri Noh. His character was originally slated to be killed off during what turned out to be the show's only season, but after his turn as Sulu in Star Trek boosted his popularity, the producers revised the show's storyline so that he survived, in an attempt to boost declining ratings.

In 2012, he was part of the cast ensemble of Go On as Steven.

Cho starred as Henry Higgs in the short-lived sitcom Selfie, a retooling of the play Pygmalion by George Bernard Shaw, becoming the first Asian American man to play a romantic lead on a U.S. romantic comedy television series in 2014. Julie Anne Robinson, one of the directors and executive producers of Selfie, revealed in 2021 interviews that she strongly supported casting Cho and had to persuade "top to bottom of everybody in that chain" that he was the perfect choice for the role, which took a long time to consider. Robinson fought for Cho and won, saying, "That's what I'm most proud of about that whole pilot." In July 2022, when Cho was asked about his thoughts on the show's cancellation, he answered, "I'm still stunned to see how many people still love that series. And yeah, I was bummed when it got canceled. I just thought that was a good show." In January 2023, Cho mentioned he had not received many offers for romantic comedy roles since Selfie.

In 2016, he was a series regular for the television show as Andy Kim in the second season of The Exorcist television series.

In 2017, he starred in the film Columbus, which received critical acclaim.

In 2018, Cho starred in the film Searching, playing a man combing social media for clues to his daughter's disappearance. He was the first Asian-American actor to headline a mainstream thriller in Hollywood. Also in 2018, he was presented with the Spotlight Award at the San Diego International Film Festival.

In April 2019, Variety reported that Cho had been cast as Spike Spiegel in a live-action version of the Cowboy Bebop series. However, production shut down when Cho suffered a knee injury in October and remained shut down until late September 2020 due to the COVID-19 pandemic. Cowboy Bebop premiered on Netflix on November 19, 2021.

He wrote a middle school grade novel book for younger readers called Troublemaker on March 22, 2022.

In May 2022, Cho was cast in the second season of Apple TV+'s comedy series The Afterparty.

Musical career
Cho is the lead singer for Viva La Union (formerly known as Left of Zed), a Los Angeles garage rock band composed of former Berkeley and USC students. They have one album, self-titled, while their song "Chinese Baby" is featured on the Harold & Kumar Escape from Guantanamo Bay soundtrack.

Personal life
Cho married actress Kerri Higuchi in 2006. They met at UC Berkeley and later dated  when they came to Los Angeles. They have a son, born in 2008, and a daughter, born in 2013. As of 2015, he and his family reside in Los Angeles, California. He is close to his father, a former preacher, and would like to play a role in the story of his father's generation, growing up in North Korea through the Korean War.

Cho has indicated he has found freedom in being Harold in the Harold and Kumar films because the stoner character goes against the grain of Asian Americans onscreen. He has said he has experienced racism throughout his career in Hollywood and that he tries to take roles that do not perpetuate Asian stereotypes. When asked to do an Asian accent for Big Fat Liar, Cho refused. "I don't want to do this role in a kid's comedy, with an accent, because I don't want young people laughing at an accent inadvertently", he wrote. In a 2015 tweet he said, "Stop turning Asian roles white. It's bullshit and we all know it." On being the first Asian to play a romantic lead on a U.S. romantic comedy television series, he described his casting in Selfie as being "revolutionary" and a "personal revolution" for him because of its uniqueness in Hollywood. "Asians narratively in shows are insignificant. They're the cop, or waitress, or whatever it is. You see them in the background. So to be in this position ... is bit of a landmark", he has said on the inability of Asians getting offered such roles.

In 2016, Cho was the face of the "#StarringJohnCho" social movement and hashtag campaign, created by William Yu, wherein Cho is Photoshopped onto existing movie posters as the male lead. The purpose of the project was to call attention to the lack of opportunities for Asian American actors in Hollywood.

Cho supported the 2012 re-election campaign of Democratic U.S. President Barack Obama.

Filmography

Film

Television

Stage/Theater

Web series

Video games

Book 

 Troublemaker (March 22, 2022) - middle school grade novel for younger readers

References

External links 

 
 
 

1972 births
20th-century American male actors
21st-century American male actors
21st-century American singers
21st-century American male singers
American film actors of Asian descent
American male actors of Korean descent
American male film actors
American male television actors
Living people
Male actors from Glendale, California
Male actors from Seoul
South Korean emigrants to the United States
University of California, Berkeley alumni